Tân Thạnh is a rural district (huyện) of Long An province in the Mekong Delta region of Vietnam.

As of 2003 the district had a population of 78,970. The district covers an area of 408 km². The district capital lies at Tân Thạnh township.

Divisions
The district is divided into one urban municipality and 12 communes:

Tân Thạnh township, Bắc Hòa, Hậu Thạnh Đông, Hậu Thạnh Tây, Kiến Bình, Nhơn Hòa, Nhơn Hòa Lập, Nhơn Ninh, Tân Bình, Tân Hòa, Tân Lập and Tân Ninh.

References

Districts of Long An province